René Hicks (born June 28, 1956) is an American comedian and actress. She has appeared on Comedy Central's Comedy Central Presents and in numerous college shows. She was twice named NACA Comedy Entertainer of the Year, in 1995 and 1997. Hicks is also a former accountant and former college athlete. Her television credits include guest appearances on Hangin' with Mr. Cooper and Midnight Caller.

Television
 Stand-Up Spotlight (TV Series documentary) (1988)
 Midnight Caller (TV Series) (1989)
 1/2 Hour Comedy Hour (TV Series) (1990)
 Hangin' with Mr. Cooper (TV Series) (1994)
 Best of Comedy Live (TV Movie) (1995)
 The Daily Show (TV Series) (1998)
 Renee Hicks (1998)
 Comedy Central Presents (TV Series documentary) (2000)
 Rene Hicks (2000) (2000)
 The World Comedy Tour: Melbourne 2002 (TV Special) (2002)
 Coming Out Party (Video) (2003)
 Out on the Edge (TV Special documentary) (2004)
 Laughing Matters... More! (Documentary) (2006)

Filmography

 A Low Down Dirty Shame (1994)
 Coming Out Party (2003) 
 Out on the Edge (2004)

External links
René Hicks' Website

Living people
African-American female comedians
American stand-up comedians
People from San Francisco
American women comedians
20th-century American comedians
21st-century American comedians
Comedians from California
Stand Up! Records artists
1956 births
20th-century African-American women
20th-century African-American people
21st-century American women
21st-century African-American women
21st-century African-American people